Rolls-Royce New Zealand Ltd v Carter Holt Harvey Ltd [2005] 1 NZLR 324 is decision of the Court of Appeal of New Zealand regarding tort claims in situations where a claim can be in both tort and contract.

Background
Carter Holt entered into a contract with ECNZ (now Genesis Energy) for them to construct a cogeneration plant at their Kinleith paper mill that would be fueled by waste byproduct from the mill, with the contract having a non liability clause.

ECNZ in turn subcontracted the work to Rolls-Royce.

Problems later were experienced with the generators that were installed, and CHH sued ECNZ for breach of contract. As there was no contract between CHH and Rolls-Royce, they were sued for negligence in tort.

Rolls-Royce applied for the tort claim against them to be struck out on the basis that ECNZ could not have a claim in both contract and tort.

Held
The court ruled where parties are involved in complex commercial relationships, there could only be duties owed in contract, and not in tort. Accordingly, the court granted Rolls-Royces application to strike out part of the claim.

However, the court did leave open to a claim in tort still being arguable for misrepresentation claims in tort, as per in Hedley Byrne.

References

Court of Appeal of New Zealand cases
New Zealand tort case law
2005 in case law
2005 in New Zealand law